Allen James Babcock (June 17, 1898 – June 27, 1969) was an American prelate of the Catholic Church who served as the seventh Bishop of Grand Rapids, Michigan from 1954 to 1969.

Biography

Early life 
Babcock was born on June 17, 1898, in Bad Axe, Michigan to Willard Babcock and Susan Ryan. He attended the University of Detroit Jesuit High School in Detroit, then in 1917 entered Assumption College in Windsor, Ontario, studying there until 1919.  

In 1920, Babcock traveled to Rome to reside at the Pontifical North American College.  He received a Bachelor of Sacred Theology degree in 1922 and a Licentiate of Sacred Theology in 1924 from the Propaganda Fide University in Rome.

Priesthood 
Babcock was ordained to the priesthood for the Archdiocese of Detroit by Cardinal Basilio Pompilj in Rome for the Archdiocese of Detroit on March 7, 1925.  After returning to Detroit, Babcock was assigned as assistant pastor at Holy Name Parish in that city.  He was transferred in 1928 to serve as assistant pastor at St. Thomas Parish in Ann Arbor, Michigan.  At the same time, he was appointed chaplain at the St. Mary's Student Parish next to the University of Michigan campus in Ann Arbor.

Babcock returned to Rome in1936 to serve as vice rector for the North American College.  Pope Piux XII honored him in 1938 with the title of papal chamberlain, allowing him to be called monsignor. (also March 9, 1939).  With the closing of the North American College in 1940 due to World War II, Babcock came back to the United States; he was appointed pastor of St. Mary's parish in Ann Arbor.  In 1942, Babcock was appointed rector of Blessed Sacrament in Detroit.

Auxiliary Bishop of Detroit 
On February 15, 1947, Babcock was appointed as an auxiliary bishop of Detroit and titular bishop of Irenopolis in Cilicia by Pope Pius XII. He received his episcopal consecration on March 25, 1947, from Cardinal Edward Mooney, with Bishops William Murphy and Stephen Woznicki serving as co-consecrators.  Later that year, Babcock was appointed as vicar for the religious orders in the archdiocese and was name a domestic prelate by the pope.  In 1948, he became a consultor for the archdiocese.

Bishop of Grand Rapids 
On March 23, 1954, Pope Pius XII appointed Babcock as bishop of the Diocese of Grand Rapids.  He was installed on May 20, 1954.  Babcock attended the Second Vatican Council in Rome (1962–1965).

Death and legacy 
Allen Babcock died of cancer on June 27, 1969 at St. Mary's Hospital in Grand Rapids at age 71.

References

1898 births
1969 deaths
People from Bad Axe, Michigan
Participants in the Second Vatican Council
Roman Catholic bishops of Grand Rapids
Roman Catholic Archdiocese of Detroit
20th-century Roman Catholic bishops in the United States